The 2023 ACU British Motocross Championship season (known for sponsorship reasons as the Revo MXGB fuelled by Gulf Race Fuels) is the 71st British Motocross Championship season. 

Tommy Searle starts the season as the reigning champion in the MX1 class after picking up his fourth title in 2022. In the MX2 class, Conrad Mewse is the defending champion after winning his third national title in the previous season. However, Mewse will not defend his title as he moves into the MX1 class for 2023.

Race calendar and results
The full calendar with both dates and venues was released on 16th February.

MX1

MX2

Circuit locations

MX1

Participants

Riders Championship

{|
|

MX2

Participants

Riders Championship

{|
|

References

British Motocross Championship
Motocross Championship
British Motocross Championship